George Chryst (April 30, 1937 – December 3, 1992) was an American football player and coach. He served as the head football coach at the University of Wisconsin–Platteville from 1979 to 1992. He was the father of three sons who became involved in football coaching: Geep, Rick, and Paul.

References

1938 births
1992 deaths
Wisconsin Badgers football coaches
Wisconsin Badgers football players
Wisconsin–Platteville Pioneers athletic directors
Wisconsin–Platteville Pioneers football coaches
High school football coaches in Wisconsin